Series 29 of Top Gear, a British motoring magazine and factual television programme, was broadcast in the United Kingdom on BBC One during 2020, consisting of five episodes between 4 October and 1 November. The COVID-19 pandemic affected production of the series, with several changes made as a result—studio segments were filmed on an outdoor set with social distancing maintained between presenters, audience members and production staff, the celebrity segment was dropped, and most films were recorded within Britain; a single international film was created, but this was produced in February 2020.

This series' highlights included the presenters making their own home-made ice cream van, enduring a 24-hour challenge with saloon cars, motoring challenges involving cheap hire cars in Cyprus, and a tribute to racing legend Stirling Moss.

Production 
On 10 February 2020, it was announced that a twenty-ninth series of Top Gear had begun filming and would air on BBC One, being the first series of the show to do so.  On 16 May 2020, it was announced that, due to the COVID-19 pandemic, the series would not feature international films (with the exception of the Cyprus rental car challenge, which was filmed in February 2020); instead the show would film in and around the UK.

On 9 September 2020, it was announced that the show would feature a new drive in studio on the runway at Dunsfold, to ensured that audience members were physically distanced during filming. This series was the last series to have its studio segments filmed at Dunsfold Aerodrome; Television Centre, London was used for filming studio segments from the thirtieth series onwards. 

For this series the Star in a Reasonably Fast Car segment was dropped to maintain social distancing.

Episodes

References

External links
 Series 29 at the Internet Movie Database

2020 British television seasons
Top Gear seasons